Brownville is an unincorporated community and census-designated place (CDP) located within Old Bridge Township, in Middlesex County, New Jersey, United States. As of the 2010 United States Census, the CDP's population was 2,383.

Geography
According to the United States Census Bureau, the CDP had a total area of 1.003 square miles (2.598 km2), including 1.002 square miles (2.594 km2) of land and 0.001 square miles (0.004 km2) of water (0.15%).

Demographics

Census 2010

Census 2000
As of the 2000 United States Census there were 2,660 people, 1,165 households, and 709 families living in the CDP. The population density was 1,092.6/km2 (2,823.7/mi2). There were 1,186 housing units at an average density of 487.1/km2 (1,259.0/mi2). The racial makeup of the CDP was 84.29% White, 4.62% African American, 0.04% Native American, 8.12% Asian, 1.17% from other races, and 1.77% from two or more races. Hispanic or Latino of any race were 5.86% of the population.

There were 1,165 households, out of which 28.0% had children under the age of 18 living with them, 48.8% were married couples living together, 9.0% had a female householder with no husband present, and 39.1% were non-families. 35.2% of all households were made up of individuals, and 17.4% had someone living alone who was 65 years of age or older. The average household size was 2.28 and the average family size was 2.99.

In the CDP the population was spread out, with 21.8% under the age of 18, 4.9% from 18 to 24, 31.9% from 25 to 44, 25.1% from 45 to 64, and 16.3% who were 65 years of age or older. The median age was 40 years. For every 100 females, there were 81.1 males. For every 100 females age 18 and over, there were 76.6 males.

The median income for a household in the CDP was $61,750, and the median income for a family was $83,636. Males had a median income of $56,111 versus $44,750 for females. The per capita income for the CDP was $30,520. About 2.7% of families and 6.3% of the population were below the poverty line, including 3.3% of those under age 18 and 19.9% of those age 65 or over.

References

Census-designated places in Middlesex County, New Jersey
Old Bridge Township, New Jersey